Tufte is a surname of Norwegian origin. Notable people with the name include: 
 Virginia Tufte (fl. 1920s-2010s), American author and distinguished emerita professor of English
 Edward Tufte (born 1942), American statistician, political scientist, graphic designer, and author 
 Bård Tufte Johansen (born 1969), Norwegian comedian 
 Jerod E. Tufte (born 1975), American judge
 Olaf Tufte (born 1976),  Norwegian competition rower and Olympic gold medal winner

See also
Tofte (disambiguation)
Toft (disambiguation)
Tuft (surname)

Norwegian-language surnames